The Drygalski Mountains are a group of scattered mountains and nunataks lying between the Filchner Mountains and the Kurze Mountains in the Orvin Mountains of Queen Maud Land. They were discovered by the Third German Antarctic Expedition (1938–1939), led by Captain Alfred Ritscher, and named for Professor Erich von Drygalski, the leader of the First German Antarctica Expedition of 1901–03. They were remapped from air photos and survey by the Sixth Norwegian Antarctic Expedition, 1956–60.

See also
 Fenristunga
 List of mountains of Queen Maud Land

References 

Mountain ranges of Queen Maud Land
Orvin Mountains